Michael Tulloch is a Jamaican professional football player and manager.

Career
In 1980, he made his debut in the national team, where he played until 1988.

From January until December 2004 he coached the British Virgin Islands national football team.

References

External links
Profile at Soccerway.com
Profile at Soccerpunter.com

Year of birth missing (living people)
Living people
Jamaican footballers
Jamaica international footballers
Jamaican football managers
Expatriate football managers in the British Virgin Islands
British Virgin Islands national football team managers
Place of birth missing (living people)

Association footballers not categorized by position
Jamaican expatriate sportspeople in the British Virgin Islands
Jamaican expatriate football managers